Skyler Gray Rogers is a Canadian soccer player who plays for Cavalry FC in the Canadian Premier League.

Early life
He played youth soccer with Calgary Foothills FC. He played for Team Alberta at the 2022 Canada Summer Games.

University career
In 2022, he began attending Mount Royal University, where he played for the men's soccer team. He scored his first goal on September 18 against the Trinity Western Spartans.

Club career
In 2022, Rogers signed a developmental contract with Cavalry FC of the Canadian Premier League. In August 2022, he departed the club per terms of his developmental contract to head to university.

References

External links

Canadian soccer players
2004 births
Living people
Canadian Premier League players
Cavalry FC players